The Shawmere River is a river in Sudbury District in northeastern Ontario, Canada. It is in the James Bay drainage basin, and is a left tributary of the Ivanhoe River.

Course
The river begins at a small, unnamed lake in geographic Gamey Township, and flows north to Yohannson Lake, where it enters geographic Crockett Township. It flows briefly through the northwest corner of the township and enters geographic Sandy Township, continuing its northeast course under Ontario Highway 101. It heads north into geographic Murdock Township into Renée Lake, on the border of geographic Paul Township to the west and geographic Warren Township to the east. The river heads north out the lake on the Paul Township side, takes in the left tributary Little Shawmere River, then turns northeast back into Warren Township and continues northeast into geographic Lemoine Township. It flows into Lemoine Lake where it takes in the right tributary Carty Creek, then into Shawmere Lake where it takes in the left tributaries Lincoln Creek and Mishionga Creek. It passes northeast through the northwestern tip of geographic Folyet Township, and  enters geographic Oates Township. It passes under the Canadian National Railway transcontinental railway main line, at that point passed but not served by Via Rail transcontinental Canadian trains, at the railway point of Shawmere, and reaches its mouth at the Ivanhoe River. The Ivanhoe River flows via the Groundhog River, the Mattagami River and the Moose River to James Bay.

Tributaries
Mishionga Creek (left)
Lincoln Creek (left)
Carty Creek (right)
Little Shawmere River (left)

References

Sources

Rivers of Sudbury District